The 2014 India Super Series was the fourth super series tournament of the 2014 BWF Super Series. The tournament took place in New Delhi, India from 1–6 April 2014 and had a total purse of $250,000. A qualification was held to fill four places in both singles events and Men's doubles of the main draws.

Men's singles

Seeds 

  Lee Chong Wei
  Chen Long
  Kenichi Tago
  Jan Ø. Jørgensen
  Boonsak Ponsana
  Wang Zhengming
  Du Pengyu
  Shon Wan-ho

Top half

Bottom half

Finals

Women's singles

Seeds 

  Li Xuerui (Final)
  Wang Shixian (Champion)
  Wang Yihan (Semifinal)
  Ratchanok Intanon
  Bae Yeon-ju
  Sung Ji-hyun
  Tai Tzu-ying
  Saina Nehwal

Top half

Bottom half

Finals

Men's doubles

Seeds 

  Hiroyuki Endo / Kenichi Hayakawa
  Mathias Boe / Carsten Mogensen
  Liu Xiaolong / Qiu Zihan
  Angga Pratama / Ryan Agung Saputra
  Hoon Thien How / Tan Wee Kiong
  Kim Sa-rang / Yoo Yeon-seong
  Ko Sung-hyun / Shin Baek-cheol
  Takeshi Kamura / Keigo Sonoda

Top half

Bottom half

Finals

Women's doubles

Seeds 

  Christinna Pedersen / Kamilla Rytter Juhl
  Misaki Matsutomo / Ayaka Takahashi
  Bao Yixin / Tang Jinhua
  Jang Ye-na / Kim So-young
  Tian Qing / Zhao Yunlei
  Ma Jin / Wang Xiaoli
  Pia Zebadiah Bernadeth / Rizki Amelia Pradipta
  Reika Kakiiwa / Miyuki Maeda

Top half

Bottom half

Finals

Mixed doubles

Seeds 

  Zhang Nan / Zhao Yunlei
  Tontowi Ahmad / Lilyana Natsir
  Joachim Fischer Nielsen / Christinna Pedersen
  Ko Sung-hyun / Kim Ha-na
  Sudket Prapakamol / Saralee Thoungthongkam
  Markis Kido / Pia Zebadiah Bernadeth
  Riky Widianto / Puspita Richi Dili
  Kenichi Hayakawa / Misaki Matsutomo

Top half

Bottom half

Finals

References

India
India Open (badminton)
India Super Series
India Super Series
Sport in New Delhi